Lasioglossum pilosum is a species of sweat bees in the family Halictidae.
The species is a generalist and known to pollinate flowers as well as commercial fruits like apples. It is sometimes known to cause a slightly irritating sting, mild in comparison to most other stinging bee species

References

Further reading

External links

 NCBI Taxonomy Browser, Lasioglossum pilosum

pilosum
Insects described in 1853